The siege of Krujë refers to four attempts of the Ottoman Empire to capture Krujë in Albania during the 15th century.
First Siege of Krujë, 1450
Second Siege of Krujë, 1466
Third Siege of Krujë, 1467
Fourth Siege of Krujë, 1478